Are You Scared To Get Happy? was an influential music fanzine published from Bristol, United Kingdom between 1985 and 1987 by Matt Haynes and Mark Carnell.  Haynes later went on to found Sarah Records with Clare Wadd. It concentrated on what would now be termed twee pop bands, and was notable for its hardline approach to the independent ethic, as well as its expansive, lyrical writing style. Many subsequent fanzines were influenced by AYSTGH, and it was also a key influence on record labels such as Unpopular.

AYSTGH set a trend in indie-pop fanzines by including flexi-discs. These had some of the earliest releases by bands such as Baby Lemonade, Remember Fun, The Clouds, The Bachelor Pad, Razorcuts, Talulah Gosh, The Siddeleys and Reserve, and several of the early Sarah Records bands. The series of flexidiscs – released on the Sha-La-La label – was shared across several fanzines operating at the time. Initially these were Simply Thrilled, Baby Honey, and Trout Fishing In Leytonstone, and subsequently fanzines in Japan and Germany.

References

1985 establishments in England
1987 disestablishments in England
Defunct magazines published in the United Kingdom
Fanzines
Magazines established in 1985
Magazines disestablished in 1987
Mass media in Bristol
Music magazines published in the United Kingdom